Podes (Ancient Greek: Ποδής Podēs) was the son of Eetion in Greek mythology, and thus the brother of Andromache, wife of Hector, whom he is said to have befriended.

Traditional treatment

Podes fought on the side of the Trojans in the Trojan War, and was killed by Menelaus. However, in Book 6 of the Iliad, Andromache claims that her seven brothers have been killed by Achilles. This contradiction is not resolved.

Note

References 

 Homer, The Iliad with an English Translation by A.T. Murray, Ph.D. in two volumes. Cambridge, MA., Harvard University Press; London, William Heinemann, Ltd. 1924. . Online version at the Perseus Digital Library.
 Homer, Homeri Opera in five volumes. Oxford, Oxford University Press. 1920. . Greek text available at the Perseus Digital Library.

People of the Trojan War